Saint Eugene or Saint-Eugene may refer to:

People 
Eugène de Mazenod (1782–1861),
Pope Eugene I, Saint
Saint Eugene of Derry

Saint Eugene martyred by Huneric
Saint Eugene, father of Marina the Monk
Mar Awgin (Saint Eugenios)

The Orthodox Church has one Saint Eugene:
Saint Eugene of Trebizond, or Eugenios of Trebizond

Places

Canada 

 Saint-Eugène, Quebec, a municipality in the administrative region of Centre-du-Québec
 Saint-Eugène-de-Guigues, Quebec, often referred to simply as Saint-Eugène
 Saint-Eugène, Ontario, a village in the Township of East Hawkesbury

France 

 Saint-Eugène, Aisne
 Saint-Eugène, Charente-Maritime
 Saint-Eugène, Saône-et-Loire
 Saint-Eugène, a former commune in Calvados, now integrated into Formentin

See also
Pope Eugene III (died 1153), Pope from 1145 to 1153